Alfred James Vincent (9 February 1874 – 6 December 1915) was an Australian cartoonist born in Launceston, Tasmania.

Alf Vincent contributed work to the Melbourne Punch from 1895, in 1896 succeeding Tom Carrington as feature artist. After many years of submitting work to the Sydney Bulletin, he joined their staff in 1898, as a replacement for Tom Durkin and remained there until 1915. He also contributed to The Bulletins sister publication, Lone Hand.

His work may be mistaken for that of his idol Phil May (1864–1903), a fact that was noted by several critics, including A. G. Stephens and Lionel Lindsay.

He was a member of the Melbourne Savage Club from 1900 to 1915 and designed the club emblem. Along with Randolph Bedford, Vincent was instrumental in the Savage Club changing their articles to accept artists as members without payment of a joining fee.  This resulted in most of Melbourne's leading [male] artists joining the Club in the early Twentieth Century.

After some months of ill health, aged 41, he committed suicide by cutting his throat with a razor.

Sources
McCullough, Alan, Encyclopedia of Australian Art, Hutchinson of London, 1968, 
Backhouse, Sue, Tasmanian Artists of the Twentieth Century, Pandani Press, Hobart, 1988, 
 Williams, Graeme H., A Socio-Cultural Reading: the Melbourne Savage Club through its Collections, MA (thesis), Deakin, 2013

References

Australian cartoonists
1874 births
1915 deaths
People from Launceston, Tasmania
1915 suicides
Suicides by sharp instrument in Australia
Suicides in New South Wales